Music from and Inspired by Jerry Springer's Movie Ringmaster is the soundtrack to Neil Abramson's 1998 comedy film Ringmaster. It was released on March 23, 1999 through Lil' Joe Records, and consists of hip hop music. The album features songs performed by the 2 Live Crew, Freak Nasty, MC Breed, H-Town, 2Pac, Fat Joe, Ice-T, Indo G, Keith Sweat, Lil' Blunt, Lorenzo Smith and Trellini.

The soundtrack was not much of a success making it only to number 80 on the Top R&B/Hip-Hop Albums and featured  "Take It Slow" peaking at number 94 on the Hot R&B/Hip-Hop Songs.

Track listing

Charts

References

External links

1999 soundtrack albums
Comedy film soundtracks
Hip hop soundtracks
Albums produced by Warren G
Miami bass albums